Thévenin is a surname. Notable people with the surname include:

Charles Thévenin (1764–1838), neoclassical French painter
 Denis Thévenin, birth name of French author Georges Duhamel
Léon Charles Thévenin (1857–1926), French engineer
Nicolas Thévenin (born 1958), bishop and Vatican diplomat
Olivier Thévenin (born 1968), French racing driver